Minus the Machine is the sixth studio album by American alternative metal band 10 Years. It was released on August 7, 2012 through their own independent label called Palehorse Records, which is a part of Warner Music Group's Independent Label Group. Lead singer, Jesse Hasek, spoke about the album saying "We wanted to create an album that has no boundaries." He continues by saying, "When you feel like you're being told to go through motions and jump through hoops, it takes the heart out of it. It's better to do what comes naturally and then figure out the after-effect."

The album debuted at No. 26 on the Billboard 200, No. 8 on the Top Rock Albums chart and No. 2 on Hard Rock Albums chart, selling 12,000 copies in the first week. The album has sold 45,000 copies in the US as of April 2015.

History
On April 2, 2012, 10 Years officially announced that they had been recording their latest album, Minus the Machine, which was initially set for a release date of July 17, 2012. Later, the band announced that they would be moving the release date back two weeks and would instead be releasing it on July 31, 2012. Shortly after, the date was moved to August 7, 2012. On July 15, 2012, the album became available for pre-order on iTunes.

On July 12, 2012, the song "Knives" was uploaded to the official 10 Years YouTube with footage of the band touring.

On May 26, the band had been recorded performing two shows in a row on YouTube, as they played two songs from the album for the first time: "Backlash" and the title track "Minus the Machine."

On June 19, 10 Years officially released their first single, "Backlash", on radio.

On August 6, 10 Years released an online stream of their new album on AOL Music.

On October 26, 10 Years officially announced their second single, "Dancing with the Dead".

On June 21, 2013, the band officially announced through their Facebook page that the third single from the album would be "Minus the Machine".

Track listing

Personnel
 Jesse Hasek – vocals
 Brian Vodinh – guitar, drums, programming, keys, backing vocals, production, mixing
 Ryan "Tater" Johnson – guitar, backing vocals
 Lewis "Big Lew" Cosby – bass

Trivia
 The songs "Tightrope" and "Baptized in Fire" share the same verses.

References

10 Years (band) albums
2012 albums